John Ashton (1830 – 25 December 1896) was a Welsh musician from Montgomeryshire, who had worked as a policeman and shoemaker. He wrote a number of songs and hymns, including Trefeglwys, written in 1857.

Ashton's songs were published in Miwsig y Miloedd,  Caniadau y Cysegr a'r Teulu, Llyfr Tonau Cynulleidfaol, and Cerddor yr Ysgol Sabothol. He died in New Zealand, having emigrated there in 1874.

References 

1830 births
1896 deaths
Welsh composers
Welsh male composers
Welsh emigrants to New Zealand
British emigrants to New Zealand
19th-century British male musicians